Eaton Operatic Society was a Canadian musical organization located in Toronto, Ontario that presented operas, operettas, musicals, and choral works from 1919 to 1965. Originally a choir that specialized in mounting oratorios, the group eventually morphed into a light opera company in the early 1930s.

History
Originally a choir, the Eaton Operatic Society was titled the Eaton Choral Society when it was formed by employees of the T. Eaton Co department store in 1919. The group performed annual concerts in Massey Hall, assembling an orchestra mainly of players from the Toronto Symphony Orchestra.  Notable performers to have appeared with the choir included harpist Carlos Salzedo and singer Paul Althouse. Herbert M. Fletcher was the group's first conductor, serving in that role until 1925 when he was succeeded by T.J. Crawford.

In 1931 the organization was retitled the Eaton Operatic Society and then began to produce operetta productions in addition to presenting choral concerts, at a new auditorium at The Carlu. Eventually the choir was completely disbanded during the mid-1930s. The first operetta staged by the society was Gilbert and Sullivan's Iolanthe at the Eaton Auditorium on 2 March 1932. The group continued to mount operettas at the Eaton Auditorium every Spring through 1965. The group also toured frequently with their productions to other cities in southern Ontario and performed at Canadian army bases during World War II. In its early years, the Savoy operas of Gilbert and Sullivan were the chief part of the society's repertoire, including Iolanthe (1932, 1938, 1950), The Gondoliers (1933, 1939, 1948, 1954), The Mikado (1934, 1940, 1949), The Yeoman of the Guard (1935, 1941, 1952), and The Pirates of Penzance (1936, 1942, 1953).   Beginning in 1954, the society's repertory consisted exclusively of musicals and other operettas, including The Vagabond King (1957, 1965) and Rose-Marie (1959).

In 1947 Harry Norris succeeded T.J. Crawford as the Eaton Operatic Society's music director. He left after only one season when Godfrey Ridout became director. Ridout remained for nine years, and then was succeeded by Lloyd Bradshaw (1959-1961) and Horace Lapp (1962-1965).  Lois Marshall performed with the company.

References

Canadian choirs
Canadian opera companies
Gilbert and Sullivan performing groups
Musical groups from Toronto
Musical groups established in 1919
Musical groups disestablished in 1965
Arts organizations established in 1919